Dennis Tan Lip Fong (born 31 August 1970) is a Singaporean politician and lawyer. A member of the opposition Workers' Party (WP), he has been the Member of Parliament (MP) representing Hougang SMC since 2020.

Education 
Tan was educated at Nanyang Primary School, Raffles Institution and Raffles Junior College before he went on to read law at the University of Nottingham. After graduating with a Bachelor of Laws (Honours) in 1994, Tan attended the Bar Professional Training Course in London and became a barrister-at-law at the Middle Temple. Later, he completed a Master of Laws in maritime law at the University of Southampton in 2005.

Political career 
Tan started as a volunteer with the Workers' Party during the 2011 general election, becoming a member in early 2012. He contested in the 2015 general election in Fengshan SMC and obtained 42.5% of the polled votes. Following the election, Tan was appointed a Non-Constituency Member of Parliament (NCMP) in the 13th Parliament, serving on the Public Petitions Committee of Parliament. He was previously a Non-constituency Member of Parliament (NCMP) of the 13th Parliament of Singapore from 16 September 2015 to 22 June 2020.At the 2020 general election, Tan stood as a candidate in Hougang SMC. During the campaign he complained that some of his campaign posters had been "pulled down" by the ruling PAP from their original height. However, in response, the Elections Department said that this was because the candidates posters had been posted at an incorrect height and could obstruct the sight of motorists.

He defeated PAP's Lee Hong Chuang with 61.21% of the vote, retaining the seat for WP.

Tan is a member of the Workers’ Party Central Executive Committee where he serves as the Organising Secretary. He has also previously served as Treasurer and Vice-Chair of the party's media team. He was elected to the Workers’ Party Central Executive Committee member as Organising Secretary.

In the Aljuined Hougang Town Council, Tan served as a member of the Estate and Liaison Committee. He also served as Chairman since 2022.

Personal life 
Tan has practised as a shipping lawyer since 1997. Prior to becoming an advocate and solicitor at the Supreme Court of Singapore in 1997, Tan was a barrister-at-law at the Middle Temple in London. He re-qualified as a solicitor at the Supreme Court of England and Wales in 1999 while working in the English law firm Stephenson Harwood. He was previously a partner in Ang & Partners, a shipping law firm. In 2005, he started the shipping law firm, DennisMathiew, with a partner. He is also a fellow of the Chartered Institute of Arbitrators in United Kingdom.

Tan participates in triathlons, and is fluent in Hokkien and Teochew. He is married to Tan Hui Tsing, also a lawyer and a Workers' Party member. Together they have a daughter.

References

External links
 Dennis Tan on Parliament of Singapore
 

Workers' Party (Singapore) politicians
Singaporean politicians of Chinese descent
Alumni of the University of Nottingham
Alumni of the University of Southampton
Raffles Institution alumni
Raffles Junior College alumni
21st-century Singaporean lawyers
Singaporean Non-constituency Members of Parliament
Members of the Parliament of Singapore
1970 births
Living people